The École Supérieure des Sciences Economiques et Commerciales (more commonly ESSEC Business School or ESSEC) is a major French business and management school, with non-profit association status (French association law of 1901) founded in 1907 and whose principal campus is located in Cergy. It also has locations in La Défense, Rabat and Singapore, which are used in particular for the ESSEC Global BBA and ESSEC Executive MBA programs.

Founded by Jesuits in response to the creation of HEC Paris, it remained independent of any chamber of commerce and industry for a long time before passing in 1981 under the control of that of Versailles, which became the CCI of Paris Île-de-France in 2013. She is a member of the CY Alliance, formerly Université Paris-Seine.

The ESSEC group delivers numerous training courses in administration and management, in particular through its post-preparatory class course called the "Grande École Program" conferring the master's degree. It also delivers a "BBA" (Bachelor in Business Administration), specialized masters (SM), a master's degree in business administration (MBA) and doctorates.

Historical rival of HEC Paris and of ESCP Business School, it forms with the latter the group of "three Parisians", which designates the three most prestigious business schools in France. ESSEC is also regularly cited among the best business schools in France and in Europe.

History

Foundation (1907–1913) 
The École Supérieure des Sciences Economiques et Commerciales (ESSEC) was founded in 1907 under the name of Economic Institute by Ferdinand Le Pelletier in Paris.  Its creation followed the movement of other private business schools created under Catholic guardianship in the early twentieth century such as HEC Nord (which later became EDHEC) by the Catholic Institute of Lille or ESSCA by the Institute Catholic of Angers.

The establishment of Falloux Laws in 1854 allowed the development of religious secondary education. In a complex circumstances, marked by the Dreyfus affair (1895) and the law of separation of Church and State (1905), the Church sought to regain influence, in particular by disseminating its moral values in the economic world and by training a new generation of business leaders. ESSEC became the Catholic Church response to the creation of HEC in the context of struggle of religious congregations, especially between Jesuits against the secular and republican ideology of the state. The goal of the new institution was to "train leaders for a commercial and economic career, which requires competent men, imbued with Christian and human values". The school was located at the École Sainte Geneviève (created by Jesuits in 1854) in the Latin Quarter. The first class had seven students and studies lasted two years. In 1909, an optional third year was introduced.

The course did not stand out for its originality as it was structured around general subjects including law, accounting, languages and techniques. It was through the introduction of Christian moral values that ESSEC could stand out: students attended the apologetics conference every week in the chapel of the École Sainte Geneviève. Technical education (calligraphy, shorthand, drafting of commercial documents) was complemented with scientific education (physics, chemistry, factory visits).

1913–1940 
With the application of the law of separation of State and Church of 1905, the school premises were confiscated in 1913, obliging ESSEC to be absorbed by Catholic Institute of Paris or ICP. As a consequence, the school resources were significantly reduced. For instance, it only had one amphitheater borrowed from ICP and the elementary section was abolished. During this time, the disciplines taught, which remained almost the same until 1960, include: languages, history of trade, commercial geography, political economy, law and accounting. An emphasize was given to language teaching, with 10 hours per week length (4 hours of English and German, 1 hour of Italian and Spanish).

The school experienced difficulty surviving during the First World War. In 1914, it had only four students in the first year and two in the second year. It temporarily closed doors and only reopened in 1915. The third optional year was dropped and the school did not regain financial stability until 1920 when it welcomed more than 50 students in the first year. In 1923 the students' association was created with a solidarity fund for war widows and orphans. In 1926, the first directory of graduates was published and three years later, the first courses in business ethics were given. By 1930, the number of students increased to 150 people.

Against the crisis of the 1930s, ESSEC had to reduce its tuition fees to attract students who have more preference toward public service or regular law studies. Due to gap year of 1914-1918 and the economic crisis, the situation became even more difficult. The school was forced to accept high school graduates, uncertified examiners, and even freelance auditors who took uncertified courses.

In 1932, the Student Office was created and in 1937 the first scholarships were distributed, marking the start of a social assistance policy

1940–1960 
The reform was done under the effort of Camille Donjon from 1939 with the introduction of selection at the school entrance. A preparatory class for the exam was set up in 1941. During this time, ESSEC refused to join the unified system of écoles de commerce established by the decree of 3 December 1947 which mentioned that the State now supports the implementation of preparatory classes on the territory.

As HEC and ESCP joined this system, ESSEC positioned itself as a challenger and kept its own preparatory classes. To level its competition, ESSEC altered its school tenure from two to three years starting from 1947. This situation lasted until 1951, when ESSEC closed its own preparatory classes and opened to candidates of the public preparatory classes. In 1950, the first compulsory internship was set up which last for a period of three months and took place at the end of studies.

1960–1970 

In 1960, Gilbert Olivier replaced Father Donjon as the dean of ESSEC. His arrival, coupled with developments linked to competition, would sway the Christian identity of the school. He began the transformation by launching a survey for students on the content of courses and the pedagogy. The result showed that only minority of students were satisfied with the teaching. Teaching was judged "Scholarly, serious and lacking in openness".

Given the results of this survey, a gradual reform was put in place. Technical subjects such as chemistry and physics were abandoned, teaching content adapted to the company demand and the human factor was taken into account with the introduction of courses in sociology and human resources. In 1965, marketing classes was introduced. Method of teaching such as conferences were set up, similar to what HEC Paris and Sciences Po offered. During this time, the school adopted the teaching style of the United States schools. Furthermore, the recruitment was diversified with the introduction of the Admis on Title in 1966 which also marked the opening of the school to women. However, preparatory classes not yet being open to them.

Associative life also began in the early 1960s with the creation of the ESSEC Mardis in 1961 and the Junior Enterprise in 1967. The former is student forum of ESSEC which occasionally invite speakers from French art, sport, politics and economic space every year. It also hosts the debates which led by two students from the association.

The entrance exam was reformatted in 1969 with the elimination of the chemistry and physics test and remodeling of the oral exam which now aimed to test the logical reasoning of the candidates and not only their general knowledge. Psychometric tests and personality interviews were also introduced. Gilbert Olivier also tried to reform the program of preparatory classes to bring them closer to commercial education but gave up due to opposition from HEC and other business schools.

1970–1990 

With the reform in place, the number of students grew and the school was starting to run out of space. The school occupied three amphitheaters at the ICP and later, in 1971, administrative services would be moved to Boulevard Raspail. In 1965 a commission was set up to consider on the possibilities of moving the school location. Projects were planned in Bagneux or Gentilly, which ultimately abandoned. On July 5, 1967, a decision was taken by ESSEC to move to a new site in the town of Cergy-Pontoise where the current campus is located.

During this time, ESSEC was able to breaking free from the ICP. In 1968, the latter recognized the financial and administrative independence of the school. In 1969, the ESSEC group was founded, consisting of the school, CERESSEC, a Research Center and ISSEC, an institute for executives. ICP, however, retained one third of the seats of the Board of Directors and the appointment of the director of the school must still be approved by the rector of the ICP.

The acceptance of the move to Cergy-Pontoise by the community was polarized. It was less well received by student due to lack of public transportation to the area. Some teachers fueled the controversy, aware that such a move necessarily entails a potential of replacement of faculty members. The new school extended over and included a large amphitheater of 300 seats, eight small amphitheatres with 80 seats equipped with closed circuit television, a computer center, a large language laboratory, a library, a sports hall, a restaurant university and 48 classrooms. Its reception areas (foyers, cafeterias, chapel) were to be available to the public in Cergy. In exchange, the students could lived in housing around the city.

Before 1971, ESSEC relied mainly on executives working in companies as its teaching staff. However, the school started to setting up its permanent faculty. The grants awarded by FNEGE to finance studies of young professors or executives in the United States, who wished to return to teaching to fill the French "management gap", allowed ESSEC to build a pool of qualified teachers. In 1972, out of 20 professors, there were 9 former ESSECs having completed their training in the United States. The arrival of FNEGE Fellows, who had come back from the United States, would stimulate the reform of the curriculum. A common core curriculum was set up in the first year based on fundamentals while a course à la carte was introduced from the second year. This format is still in effect today. A minimum duration of 12 months of internship was also introduced. Furthermore. the ESSEC selectivity increased significantly with application numbers grew from 700 candidates in 1960 to 2,800 in 1973.

The decision to move to Cergy without support of public funds resulted in heavy debt to the Caisse d'Epargne and ANFESP (National Association for the Financing of Private School Equipment), the Council General of Val d'Oise. This resulted in obligation to repay an amount up to 4-5 million francs a year. These financial expenses represented 11.7% of the ESSEC budget in 1975 (compared to 5% for INSEAD). The operating budget exploded from 6 million francs in 1972 to 28 million in 1979. Tuition fees increased to one point it doubled that of HEC. In 1979, the financial crisis erupted, exacerbated by an environment of high interest rates and an economic slowdown related to the oil shock. Ultimately, the school hit a deficit of 10.4 million francs during this year. The apprenticeship tax, introduction of continuing education and the donation of student's parents were used as sources of funding. The consideration of the nationalization of ESSEC and possible attachment to the larger university were put on the table, with those ideas coming within the field of possibilities with the election of François Mitterrand to the presidency of the Republic.

Gilbert Olivier strongly opposed to the plan, seeing it as a failure of the initial project of the school to emancipate itself from the higher education system. Financial condition ultimately improved permitting the school to operate without taking such decisions. The rescue was made possible by the Versailles Chamber of Commerce, which injected 10 million francs to cover the deficit of ESSEC, bought 51% of ESSEC's ownership for 12 million francs and committed to pay an annual subsidy of 6 millions of francs from 1982 to 1989. In exchange, ESSEC retained its legal autonomy (and did not become a service of the chamber like the case of HEC Paris and ESCP with the Paris Chamber of Commerce) but had a governance system with a management board and supervisory board. This intrusion of a supervision as well as the absence of representation of the students and the professors in the general assembly triggered strikes and the launching of petitions against the plan. The agreement was finally signed on April 6, 1981. The fear of control of the school and its pedagogy would ultimately prove to be unfounded.

2000–present 
In 1999, the school decided to change the name of its Grande Ecole program to be an MBA (Master in Business Administration), an Anglo-Saxon standard normally reserved for executives who already have many years of experience. ESSEC intended to highlight its accreditation from the AACSB (American accreditation body) and the mandatory 18 months of internships of its students. The move was followed by other business schools, such as ICN Nancy and ESC Grenoble. ESSEC then reviewed its international agreements to bring the program to the MBA or Master level.

The repositioning of the program was heavily criticized by HEC Paris, EM Lyon and University Paris-Dauphine, so much so that Ali Laïdi in his book Secrets of the economic war (2004) said that HEC Paris would have mounted a destabilization operation toward ESSEC by attacking its MBA position. The case led to an opening of investigation and resolution by the Paris Chamber of Commerce.

In 2005, ESSEC expanded its campus with the inauguration of the Nautile building and further, in 2007, with the multipurpose room, the Dome (of which has 2,700 people capacity) and the Galion. The buildings were designed by Marc Seifert, son of Ivan Seifert who designed the original campus in 1973. In 2008, the library was expanded. Renovation of the restaurant area followed the following year.

In March 2006, ESSEC Business School inaugurated its new campus in Singapore within the National Library, the ESSEC Asian Center.

In 2010, ESSEC presented its strategic plan for 2010–2015. The program portfolio was repositioned: the EPSCI (post-baccalaureate program) became the bachelor of ESSEC, the name of MBA was abandoned and replaced with MSc in Management. The group's communication was unified under the name ESSEC Business School. A fundraising strategy of 150 million euros was announced. The school also aimed to be one of the 20 best Business Schools in the world, to join the 10 best schools in Asia and to make into top 5 in Europe. The abandonment of the name of MBA from its Grand Ecole program was a strategy pushback for the school. As the result, this program did not appear in the Financial Times ranking of Masters in Management since its creation in 2005 nor in the MBA because of its hybrid nature. The dean of the time, Pierre Tapie, however, did not regret this decision, because he believed that the school had gained reputation. In fact, in 2007, the Wall Street Journal ranked ESSEC Grande École program 7th in the world, ahead of HEC and INSEAD.

During this time, the school expanded its double-degree agreements with Indian Institute of Management Ahmedabad in 2006, Centrale Paris, University of Keio in 2009, École du Louvre, ENSAE and Saint-Cyr in 2010, ENS in 2011, University of Queensland, three South Korean institutions in 2014 and Bocconi University in 2015.

In 2014, Jean-Michel Blanquer, the new dean of the school, announced the strategic plan "ESSEC 3I 2020" (Internationalisation, Innovation and Involvement). The internationalization went through, a new ESSEC Asia-Pacific campus was established, which opened in 2015, an ESSEC Africa campus was opened in 2017, collaboration through a strategic alliance with CentraleSupélec and involvement of students to create their own courses and mentorship program, among other things. The school also launched its first MOOCs, inaugurated its startup incubator, ESSEC Ventures and established an experimental research laboratory, K-Lab.

Grande école degrees 

ESSEC Business School is a grande école, a French institution of higher education that is separate from, but parallel and often connected to, the main framework of the French public university system. Grandes écoles are elite academic institutions that admit students through an extremely competitive process, and a significant proportion of their graduates occupy the highest levels of French society. Similar to Ivy League schools in the United States, Oxbridge in the UK, and C9 League in China, graduation from a grande école is considered the prerequisite credential for any top government, administrative and corporate position in France.

The degrees are accredited by the Conférence des Grandes Écoles and awarded by the Ministry of National Education (France). Higher education business degrees in France are organized into three levels thus facilitating international mobility: the Licence / Bachelor's degrees, and the Master's and Doctorat degrees. The Bachelors and the Masters are organized in semesters: 6 for the Bachelors and 4 for the Masters. Those levels of study include various "parcours" or paths based on UE (Unités d'enseignement or Modules), each worth a defined number of European credits (ECTS). A student accumulates those credits, which are generally transferable between paths. A Bachelors is awarded once 180 ECTS have been obtained (bac + 3); a Masters is awarded once 120 additional credits have been obtained (bac +5). The highly coveted PGE (Grand Ecole Program) ends with the degree of Master's in Management (MiM)

Research

Departments 
The School is made up of eight research departments in different fields of human sciences: Accounting and Management Control; Business Law and Environment; Economy; Finance; Management; Operations management; Marketing; Information Systems, Decision Sciences and Statistics.

CERESSEC 
The ESSEC research center or Centre de recherche ESSEC business school (CERESSEC) was created in 1969. Supervised by AERES since 2013, the research focus is around a scientific area in partnership with the Ministry of Higher Education and Research.

According to the HCERES report issued on May 13, 2019, CERESSEC is "a leading research laboratory at national and international level, it is a leading French center in the field of management and related disciplines." It supports the school's influence in national and international rankings. The research center brings together 165 professors, on two sites in Cergy and Singapore. The professors work on nine research themes: Accounting and management control; Economy; Finance; Information system ; Law, Negotiation and Consultation; Management; Marketing; Management of Operations; Statistics.

ESSEC Iréné 
ESSEC Iréné is the Institute for Research and Education on Negotiation in Europe created in 1996. The research focus is in several topics related to negotiation, mediation, stakeholders dialogue, and conflict resolution. The stakeholder involved in the research include academics, senior civil servants, elected representatives, managers and employees of businesses, trade unionists, social mediators.

ESSEC Behavioral Research Lab 
This institute is an interdisciplinary research platform which focus on the study of human behavior in a controlled environment. The study is mainly conducted in the fields such as behavioral marketing, behavioral management, behavioral and experimental economics.

Organization and governance 
ESSEC is a nonprofit organization. Its management consists of a Director General (School Dean), assisted by its executive committee, made up in particular of the deans of programs, professors and research body. They reports to the board, which administers the association, and which is made up of two representatives of the Paris Ile-de-France CCI, a representative of the alumni association, and two qualified professionals.

The supervisory board is made up of twenty-eight members, six representatives of the Paris Ile-de-France CCI, two members of the Institut Catholique de Paris, five former students, one member of the Confederation of SMEs, four students, five professors including the dean of the professors, two members of the administrative staff of the school, and three qualified professionals.

The general assembly is the guarantor of the stability of the statutes of the association, and it is composed of the president of the CCI of Paris Île-de-France, a representative of the association of graduates, a representative of the Confederation of SMEs, the dean of professors, and the rector of the Catholic Institute of Paris (ICP).

Deans of ESSEC Business School

Rankings

Campuses 

ESSEC has 4 campuses: Cergy, Singapore, La Défense and Rabat. An Africa-Indian Ocean campus project in Mauritius was announced in 2016 but was canceled in 2017.

Cergy campus
The main ESSEC campus is located in Cergy. Inaugurated in 1973, the site is located in the city and open to the public, mixing students and inhabitants in the area. 
In 2007, two new buildings were constructed: the Dome and the Galion, both significantly increased area of the Cergy campus. The Dome, which acts as a multipurpose room, can accommodate up to 2,700 people. It is used for business forums (Career Fairs), conferences, exam site and cultural and social activities. The Galion is an administrative and educational building. It houses 54 offices and meeting rooms, 8 amphitheaters, and 12 classrooms as well as open work spaces.
At the end of 2018, the Campus 2020 project was announced, which intends to modernize the Cergy campus by 2023, for a total cost of 35 million euros (private and public funding). Among the main lines of this project are the construction of a sports center of nearly 2,000 m2, the redevelopment of the old gymnasium and the existing administrative building into spaces intended for research activities.

La Defense campus
ESSEC has had premises in the CNIT in La Défense since 1989, mainly used for continuing education and the MBA.

Singapore campus
The ESSEC Asia-Pacific campus in Singapore was announced in October 2012 by Pierre Tapie shortly before his departure. The new campus was inaugurated in May 2015 by Jean-Michel Blanquer. ESSEC has already been present in Asia since 1980 with a permanent office in Japan and in Singapore since 2005 through the ESSEC Asian Centre located in the National Library Building. After considering among Tokyo, Shanghai and Singapore, the school finally chose the latter in 2005, in particular for its position as a gateway to Asia.
Located in Nepal Hill, the campus spans five levels, 6,500 m2, can accommodate 1,500 students per year and cost 24 million euros, fully funded by ESSEC. It was designed by Singaporean architect, Dr. Liu Thai Ker (former architect planning Singapore).

Rabat campus
The creation of this campus was announced in November 2015 by Jean-Michel Blanquer and was inaugurated in April 2017. Morocco was chosen for the already effective presence of ESSEC's partner CentraleSupélec, its proximity to France and the large number of Moroccan alumni.
Located 15 km from Rabat, the campus covers 6,000 m2 and has a capacity of 480 students. The campus is located right in the Casablanca - Rabat - Kenitra axis.
The campus was built specifically for ESSEC by the Addoha real estate group to which the school pays rent (proportional to the number of students hosted during the first three years, then €360,000  / year beyond), with the possibility of to buy back the premises after nine years.
At its first school year, the campus had seventy students, including eighteen Moroccans.

Programs

ESSEC Global BBA
The undergraduate program was initially created in 1975 by ESSEC Group to prepare students to meet the needs of French firms launching operations on the international market. It was formerly known as EPSCI, "École des Practiciens du Commerce International", and is now referred to as "ESSEC Global BBA".

The Global BBA lasts for four years and is designed for candidates graduated from high school (in France "Baccalauréat").

At the end of the program, each student will have completed a minimum of 12 months of coursework abroad (each student will do two exchange programs abroad), a one-month humanitarian project and between 11 and 18 months of professional experience, which may also take place abroad.

Master of Science in Management - Grande École 

ESSEC's postgraduate programme is its Master of Science in management, designed for students with no professional experience (instead of managers with 3–5 years of experience like US MBA programs). It is the flagship program of the school.

The ESSEC MSc in management has been historically designed for candidates who have completed French preparatory classes after high school diploma and passed a competitive entrance examination known as the concours, or have a university degree (Bachelor or Master). Application is now also open to non-French students: students with a university degree of three years or more received outside of France can also apply. Students from classe préparatoire will spend two to three years after Baccalauréat only to prepare for the national entrance examination of Grandes Ecoles which includes a written part (lasting three weeks) as well as an oral part (one to four days for each grande école). It is commonly considered the most prestigious path after High School in France (only 5% of a generation will be admitted to a prépa) with Law and Medicine, and consists in intensive courses in Mathematics, History and Geography, Economy, Literature, Philosophy, and two foreign languages. In 2015, among more than 20 000 students enrolled in classe préparatoire (business section), 5 614 applied to ESSEC concours (considered one of the most difficult), only 890 were invited to oral examination and 380 were eventually admitted. This means an acceptance rate of 6.77%.

ESSEC offer an à la carte program – whether following courses at ESSEC or at a partner institution, going abroad or focusing on an associative project etc.

Master in Finance
The Master in Finance replace the old Master Techniques Financières since 2016. The Master in Finance is recognized by the French Higher Education and Research Ministry as master's degree.

There are three specialized tracks:

 Corporate Finance: M&A, Private Equity, ECM, DCM, Equity Research, Leveraged and Project Finance;
 Financial Markets: Sales, Trading, Risk Management and Portfolio Management;
FinTech & Analytics: Quantitative Asset and Risk Management, Data-based Market Making and Trading and Quant Hedge Funds (with a solid Math/Physics degree).

The Master in Finance has a partnership with the Chartered Financial Analyst (CFA).

ESSEC M.S. Advanced Masters
The Advanced master's degrees are accredited by the "Conférence des Grandes Ecoles" in France. These programs are specialised to allow students finishing their studies or young professionals to complete their initial training (usually scientific or engineering) by acquiring complementary knowledge.

ESSEC Global MBA
The Global MBA at ESSEC Business School is a 12-month, full-time MBA program with an emphasis on emerging markets and experiential learning. It offers two Majors allowing students to specialise in the following area: Luxury Brand Management, Strategy and Digital Leadership.

PhD in Business Administration
The PhD trains future professors, researchers and consultants. Before starting their dissertation work, students must follow a two-year program of courses and seminars that ends with Preliminary Examinations and a Dissertation Proposal. The curriculum starts with an intensive period of interdisciplinary training common to all students. This is followed by research training for the chosen field of specialization.

ESSEC Executive Education
More than 5,000 managers participate in ESSEC Exec Ed programs every year, primarily at La Défense campus, located in the heart of Paris' financial district and ESSEC's Singapore campus.

ESSEC & Mannheim Executive MBA
ESSEC and Mannheim Business School launched their joint Executive MBA Program in 2004. Building on the first established Executive MBAs in Europe by ESSEC since 1994, several modules are proposed in Mannheim, Paris, Singapore and various other locations worldwide in partner business schools.

International partnerships 

ESSEC has developed partnerships with universities all over the world for exchange and double degree programs, including UC Berkeley, University of Chicago, Dartmouth College, Brandeis University, Cornell University, Peking University, Tsinghua University, Seoul National University, Keio University, National University of Singapore, IIM Ahmedabad, IE Business School, University of Mannheim, King's College London, Esic Business & Marketing School, Fundação Getúlio Vargas' EAESP, among many others.

ESSEC alumni 
The association of graduates of the ESSEC or ESSEC Alumni group is founded in 1923. It brings together the 50,000 graduates of ESSEC. It spans in 75 countries within five continents. It organizes more than a thousand events per year by its two hundred volunteers and employees. The network partners with its 60 corporates and consists of 17 regional clubs and 73 chapters around the world. The association also publishes the alumni magazine, Reflets, five times a year.

Since 2017, the association has been physically present on the Cergy campus through an office open to students. Starting from the same year, lifelong ESSEC Alumni membership has been included in the tuition fees for new members, on the model already implemented by major international universities.

Notable alumni
Business

 Nicolas Hieronimus, CEO of L'Oréal Group
 Antoine Bernard de Saint-Affrique, CEO of Danone
 Michel Bon, ENA, CEO of Carrefour (1985–1992), CEO of France Telecom (1995–2002)
 Patrick Cescau, Former CEO of Unilever
 Pierre-André de Chalendar, CEO of Saint-Gobain
 Nicolas Namias, CEO of Group BPCE
 Jérôme Grivet, Deputy CEO of Crédit Agricole
 Pierre Nanterme, CEO of Accenture
 Yves Perrier, CEO of Amundi, former CFO of Société Générale
 Pierre Denis, former CEO of Jimmy Choo (fashion house)
 Marie-Christine Lombard, former CEO of TNT Express
 Dominique Reiniche, CEO of Coca-Cola Europe
 Gilles Pélisson, CEO of TF1, former CEO of Bouygues Telecom (2004–2006) and of Accor Group (2006–2011)
 Charles Bouaziz, Former CEO of PepsiCo (Europe)
 Joe Saddi, Chairman of Booz & Company
 Élisabeth Moreno,  President of Hewlett-Packard Africa, Former President of Lenovo France
 Thierry Peugeot, Chairman of the Supervisory Board of Peugeot-Citroën
 Jérôme Tafani, CEO of Burger King France

Politics

 Cécile Duflot, ex-French Minister of Housing in the Ayrault Cabinet, formerly head of the French Green Party and now head of Oxfam France
 Fleur Pellerin, ex-French Minister of Culture in the First Valls government. 
 Emmanuelle Mignon, ex-Cabinet secretary of French President Nicolas Sarkozy from 2008 to 2012
 Alexis Kohler, Chief of Staff of President of France Emmanuel Macron

Academics

 D. K. Bandyopadhyay, Indian scientific management researcher

Other well-known alumni

 Marie-José Pérec, former sprinter, three times Olympic champion
 Philippe Sollers, French writer

See also
 Chamber of Commerce and Industry of Paris
 HEC Paris
 ESCP Business School
 Triple accreditation

References

External links
 Official website

ESSEC Business School
Educational institutions established in 1907
Business schools in Singapore
Education in Paris
1907 establishments in France